Volleyball was one of the many sports which was held at the 2002 Asian Games in Busan, South Korea. All matches played at the Gijang Gymnasium.

Schedule

Medalists

Medal table

Draw
The men were drawn into two groups of five and four teams, the women were played in round robin format. The teams were seeded based on their final ranking at the 2001 Asian Men's Volleyball Championship.

Pool A
  (Host)
  (5)
 
 
 

Pool B
  (3)
  (4)

Final standing

Men

Women

References
 Men's Results
 Women's Results

External links
 Official website

 
2002 Asian Games events
Asian Games
2002
2002 Asian Games